Omoglymmius wallacei is a species of beetle in the subfamily Rhysodinae. It was described by R.T. Bell & J.R. Bell in 1988. It is known from lower montane forest on Mount Ambang near Kotamobagu, North Sulawesi (Indonesia). The specific name commemorates Alfred Russel Wallace, pioneering scientist who worked in the region, as well as "Project Wallace", during which the type series was collected (1985).

Omoglymmius wallacei measure  in length.

Notes

References

wallacei
Beetles of Indonesia
Endemic fauna of Indonesia
Fauna of Sulawesi
Beetles described in 1988